Clark Williams (July 12, 1942 – November 16, 2020) was an American politician in the state of North Dakota. He was a member of the North Dakota House of Representatives, representing the 25th district. A Democrat, from 2002 to 2015, he also served from 1983 to 1987. Williams was an alumnus of North Dakota State University and Valley City State University and was an educator.

References

1942 births
2020 deaths
People from Wahpeton, North Dakota
North Dakota State University alumni
Valley City State University alumni
Educators from North Dakota
21st-century American politicians
Democratic Party members of the North Dakota House of Representatives